MV Norris Castle, the third vessel in the Red Funnel fleet to carry the name, was built in 1968 by John I. Thornycroft & Company at Woolston  and operated as a car ferry between Southampton and East Cowes until 1994. Mrs Joan Lacon, owner of the namesake building, Norris Castle, named the ship. Originally designed to load and discharge through the bows, in 1976, she was converted to drive through operation, with mezzanine decks and an extended superstructure, by Boele in Rotterdam.

She was renamed Lovrjenac. After 14 years further service, she was laid up in 2008.

Accidents and incidents
In gale-force winds in 1981, when turning in the River Medina in the Isle of Wight, she was blown on to the Cowes Floating Bridge, but there was no serious damage done to either vessel.

References

External links
 Simplon Postcards

Ferries of England
Ferry transport on the Isle of Wight
1968 ships
Ships of Red Funnel